This is a list of zoological gardens (zoos) around the world. For aquaria, see List of aquaria. For dolphinariums, see List of dolphinariums. For an annotated list of defunct zoos and aquariums, see List of former zoos and aquariums.

Zoos are primarily facilities where animals are kept within enclosures and displayed to the public, and in which they may also be bred. Such facilities include zoos, safari parks, animal theme parks, aviaries, butterfly zoos and reptile centers, as well as wildlife sanctuaries and nature reserves where visitors are allowed.

Africa

Algeria
Algiers Zoo
Jijel Zoo
Oran Zoo

Burkina Faso
Ouagadougou Zoo

Cameroon
Mvog-Betsi Zoo – Yaoundé

Congo, Democratic Republic of the
Parc Zoologique de Lubumbashi
Zoo National de Kinshasa

Congo, Republic of the
Brazzaville Zoo

Ivory Coast
Abidjan Zoo

Egypt
Alexandria Zoo
Africa Safari Park – Cairo
Fayoum Zoo
Beni Suef Zoo
Giza Zoo

Ethiopia
Addis Ababa Lion Zoo

Ghana
Kumasi Zoo
Accra Zoo

Kenya
Haller Park – Bamburi, Mombasa

Libya
Benghazi Zoo
Tripoli Zoo

Madagascar
Lemurs' Park – near Antananarivo
Parc Ivoloina – near Toamasina
Tsimbazaza Zoo – Antananarivo

Malawi
Lilongwe Wildlife Centre

Mali
Bamako Zoo

Mauritius
Casela Nature Park
La Vanille Nature Park

Morocco
Dream Village zoo
Parc Sindibad
Rabat Zoo

Mozambique
Maputo Zoo

Nigeria
Abuja Children's Zoo
Kano Zoo
FUNAAB Zoo Park – Abeokuta
Ibadan University Zoo
Jos Wildlife Park
Ogba Zoo – Benin City
Port Harcourt Zoo
Sanda Kyarimi Park Zoo – Maiduguri

Senegal
Hann Zoological Park – Dakar

South Africa
Birds of Eden
East London Zoological Gardens
Emerald Zoo Vanderbijlpark
EndoFaun Zoological Gardens – Bapsfontein
Hartebeesport Dam Snake and Animal Park
Johannesburg Zoo
Lory Park Zoo
Mitchell Park Zoo – Durban
Mystic Monkeys and Feathers Wildlife Park
National Zoo – Pretoria
Umgeni River Bird Park – Durban
World of Birds Wildlife Sanctuary and Monkey Park – Cape Town

Sudan
Kuku Zoo - Khartoum North

Tanzania
Dar es Salaam Zoo

Tunisia
Friguia Park, Bouficha
Tunis Zoo

Uganda
Uganda Wildlife Education Centre – Entebbe

Zambia
Munda Wanga Environmental Park – Lusaka

Asia

Afghanistan
Kabul Zoo

Armenia
Yerevan Zoo

Azerbaijan
Baku Zoo

Bangladesh
List of zoos in Bangladesh

Cambodia
Phnom Tamao Wildlife Rescue Centre
Phnom Penh Safari

China
Badaling Safari World
Beijing Zoo
Bifengxia Wild Animal Park
Changsha Ecological Zoo
Chengdu Zoo
Chongqing Zoo
Dalian Forest Zoo
Guangzhou Panyu Chime-long Night Zoo
Guangzhou Xiangjian Safari Park
Guangzhou Zoo
Hangzhou Zoo
Harbin Northern Forest Zoo
Harbin Siberian Tiger Park
Harbin Zoo
Hongshan Forest Zoo
Jinan Safari Park
Jinan Zoo
Kashgar Zoo, People's Park
Kunming Zoo
Nanjing Hongshan Forest Zoo
Nanning Zoo
Qingdao Forest Wildlife World
Qingdao Zoo
Qinhuangdao Wildlife Park
Shanghai Wild Animal Park
Shanghai Zoo
Shenzhen Safari Park
Shijiazhuang Zoo
Suzhou Zoo
Tianjin Zoo
Urumqi Zoo
Yancheng Wild Animal World
Zhengzhou Zoo
Zhoukou Safari Park

Georgia
Tbilisi Zoo

Hong Kong
Edward Youde Aviary – Hong Kong Park
Hong Kong Wetland Park
Hong Kong Zoological and Botanical Gardens
Kadoorie Farm and Botanic Garden
Ocean Park Hong Kong

India
List of zoos in India

Indonesia
Bali Bird Park
Bali Safari and Marine Park, Gianyar, Bali
Bali Zoo – Singapadu, Bali
Bandung Zoo – Bandung, West Java
Batu Secret Zoo – Batu, East Java
Fauna Land at Ancol Dreamland – Ancol, Jakarta
Gembira Loka Zoo – Yogyakarta
Lembang Park & Zoo – Lembang, Bandung
Maharani Zoo & Goa – Lamongan, East Java
Medan Zoo – Medan, North Sumatera
Ragunan Zoo – Jakarta
Surabaya Zoo – Surabaya, East Java
Taman Mini Indonesia Indah – Jakarta
Taman Safari Bogor – Bogor, West Java
Taman Safari Prigen – Pasuruan, East Java

Iran
Bandar Abbas Bird Garden
Bird Garden of Isfahan
Tehran Zoological Garden
Vakil Abad Zoo – Mashhad

Iraq
Baghdad Zoo
Erbil Zoo

Israel
Biblical Museum of Natural History
Carmel Hai-Bar Nature Reserve
Haifa Zoo
Hai Kef – Rishon LeZion
Hai Park – Kiryat Motzkin
I. Meier Segals Garden for Zoological Research – Tel Aviv
Nahariya Zoo-Botanical Garden
Gan Garoo – Nir David
Petah Tikva Zoo
Ramat Gan Safari
Tisch Family Biblical Zoological Gardens - jerusalem
Yotvata Hai-Bar Nature Reserve

Japan
List of zoos in Japan

Kazakhstan
Almaty Zoo
Karaganda Zoo
Shymkent Zoo

North Korea
Korea Central Zoo – Pyongyang

South Korea
Dalseong Park – Daegu
Everland Zoo-topia – Yongin
Seoul Children's Zoo – Seoul
Seoul Grand Park Zoo – Gwacheon

Kuwait
Kuwait Zoo – Kuwait City

Macau
Macau Giant Panda Pavilion – Parque de Seac Pai Van

Malaysia
A'Famosa Animal World Safari – Alor Gajah, Malacca
Bukit Gambang Safari Park – Gambang, Kuantan, Pahang
Entopia by Penang Butterfly Farm – Teluk Bahang, Penang
Johor Zoo – Johor Bahru, Johor
Jong's Crocodile Farm and Zoo – Kuching, Sarawak
Kemaman Recreation Park and Mini Zoo – Kemaman, Terengganu
Kuala Krai mini zoo – Kuala Krai, Kelantan
Kuala Lumpur Bird Park – Kuala Lumpur
Kuala Lumpur Butterfly Park – Kuala Lumpur
Kuala Lumpur Deer Park – Kuala Lumpur
Langkawi Crocodile Adventureland – Langkawi, Kedah
Langkawi Wildlife Park – Langkawi, Kedah
Lok Kawi Wildlife Park – Lok Kawi, Sabah
Lost World Petting Zoo – Ipoh, Perak
Malacca Butterfly & Reptiles Sanctuary – Malacca
Malacca Crocodile Farm – Ayer Keroh, Malacca
Malacca Zoo – Ayer Keroh, Malacca
Miri Crocodile Farm cum Mini Zoo
National Zoo of Malaysia (Zoo Negara) – Ulu Klang, Kuala Lumpur
Sandakan Crocodile Farm – Sandakan, Sabah
Snake and Reptile Farm – Perlis
Sunway Lagoon Wildlife Park – Subang Jaya, Selangor
Taiping Zoo – Taiping, Perak
Taman Teruntum Mini Zoo – Taman Teruntum, Pahang

Myanmar
Naypyidaw Zoological Gardens
Yadanabon Zoological Gardens – Mandalay
Yangon Zoo

Nepal
Central Zoo, Jawalakhel
Pokhara Zoological park
Banbatika Zoo

Pakistan
List of zoos in Pakistan

Palestinian territories
Qalqilya Zoo – West Bank

Philippines
Albay Park and Wildlife – Legazpi, Albay
Animal Island (zoo) – Binakayan, Kawit, Cavite
Animal Wonderland – Star City, Pasay
Ave Maria Sanctuary and Park – Carcar, Cebu
Avilon Zoo – Rodriguez, Rizal
Baluarte Zoo – Vigan, Ilocos Sur
Birds International – Quezon City
Botolan Wildlife Farm – San Juan, Botolan, Zambales
Calauit Safari Park – Calauit Island, Palawan
Cavite City Zoological and Botanical Park – Sampaguita Road, Seabreeze Subdivision, Santa Cruz, Cavite City, Cavite
Cebu City Zoo and Conservation Zoo – Calunasan, Cebu City, Cebu
Corregidor Aviary and Theme Park – Corregidor Island, Cavite
Crocolandia Foundation – Biasong, Talisay, Cebu
D'Family Park Mini-Zoo – Talamban, Cebu City, Cebu
Davao Crocodile Park – Diversion Highway, Ma-a, Davao City
Eden Nature Park and Resort – Toril, Davao City
Father Tropa's Spaceship 2000 Zoo – Zamboanguita, Negros Oriental
Laguna Wildlife Park and Rescue Center – La Vista Pansol Complex, Pansol, Calamba, Laguna
Lombija Wildlife Park and Heritage Resort – Napandong, Nueva Valencia, Guimaras
Lungsod Kalikasan – Quezon City
Maasin Zoo – Maasin, Southern Leyte
Malabon Zoo and Aquarium – Governor Pascual Street, Potrero, Malabon
Malagos Garden Resort
Manila Orchidarium and Butterfly Pavilion – Rizal Park, Manila
Manila Zoological and Botanical Garden – M. Adriatico Street, Malate, Manila
Mari-it Wildlife Conservation Park – Lambunao, Iloilo
Maze Park and Resort Mini-Zoo – Mimbalot Buru-un, Iligan, Lanao del Norte
Negros Forests & Ecological Foundation – South Capitol Road, Bacolod, Negros Occidental
Ninoy Aquino Parks & Wildlife Center – Diliman, Quezon City
Palawan Butterfly Garden – Santa Monica, Puerto Princesa, Palawan
Palawan Wildlife Rescue and Conservation Center – Irawan, Puerto Princesa, Palawan
Paradise Reptile Zoo – Puerto Galera, Oriental Mindoro
ParadiZoo – Mendez, Cavite
Pasig Rainforest Park
Philippine Eagle Center – Malagos, Davao City
Philippine Tarsier and Wildlife Sanctuary – Corella, Bohol
RACSO'S Woodland Mini-Hotel and Wildlife Resort – Rizal-Tuguisan, Guimbal, Iloilo
Residence Inn Mini-Zoo – Barrio Neogan, Tagaytay, Cavite
Sagbayan Peak Tarsier Sanctuary and Butterfly Dome – Sagbayan, Bohol
San Fernando Mini-Zoo and Butterfly Sanctuary – San Fernando, La Union
Silangang Nayon Mini-Zoo – Pagbilao, Quezon
Silliman University Center for Tropical Conservation Studies (also known as the A.Y. Reyes Zoological and Botanical Garden) – Ipil Street, Daro, Dumaguete
Silliman University Marine Laboratory – Bantayan, Dumaguete
WIN Rescue Center – Subic Bay Freeport Zone, Zambales
Zoo Paradise of the World – Zamboanguita, Negros Oriental
Zoobic Safari – Subic, Zambales
Zoocobia Fun Zoo – Clark Freeport Zone, Angeles, Pampanga

Qatar
Al Khor Zoo and Family Park
Al Dosari Zoo

Singapore
Night Safari
River Wonders
Singapore Zoo

Sri Lanka
National Zoological Gardens of Sri Lanka
Pinnawala Open Zoo
Ridiyagama Safari Park

Taiwan
Fonghuanggu Bird and Ecology Park
Green World Ecological Farm
Hsinchu Zoo
Leefoo Village Theme park and zoo
Shoushan Zoo
Taipei Zoo
Wanpi World Safari Zoo

Thailand
Chiang Mai Night Safari
Chiang Mai Zoo
Khao Kheow Open Zoo
Khao Suan Kwang Zoo – Khon Kaen
Lopburi Zoo
Nakhon Ratchasima Zoo
Nong Nooch Tropical Botanical Garden
Phuket bird park
Safari Park Kanchanaburi
Safari World
Samphran Elephant Ground & Zoo
Songkhla Zoo
The Million Years Park and Pattaya Crocodile Farm

Turkey
Ankara Zoo
Darica Zoo – Istanbul
Eskişehir Zoo
Gaziantep Zoo
İzmir Wildlife Park
Polonezköy Animal Park
Bursa Zoo
Tarsus Zoo

Turkmenistan
Ashgabat Zoo

United Arab Emirates
Al Ain Zoo
Sharjah Desert Park
Dubai Dolphinarium
Dubai Safari Park
Emirates Park Zoo – Abu Dhabi
RAK Zoo – Ras Al Khaimah

Uzbekistan
Tashkent Zoo
Termez Zoo

Vietnam
Thu Le Park zoo – Hanoi
Saigon Zoo and Botanical Gardens – Ho Chi Minh City

Yemen
Sana'a Zoo 
Ta'izz Zoo

Australasia/Oceania

Australia
List of zoos in Australia

Fiji
Kula Wild Adventure Park – Sigatoka

Guam
Guam Zoo – Tumon

New Caledonia
Parc Forestier de Nouméa – Nouméa

New Zealand
Auckland Zoo – Auckland
Brooklands Zoo – New Plymouth
Caroline Bay Aviary – Timaru
Hamilton Zoo – Hamilton
Kiwi Park – Queenstown
Orana Wildlife Park – Christchurch
Wellington Zoo – Wellington
Willowbank Wildlife Reserve – Christchurch

Papua New Guinea
Port Moresby Nature Park
Adventure Park PNG – Port Moresby
The Rainforest Habitat – Lae

Europe

Albania
Tirana Zoo

Austria
Alpenzoo Innsbruck
Haus des Meeres – Vienna
Salzburg Zoo
Schloss Herberstein Zoo and Nature Park – Schloss Herberstein, Styria
Schmiding Zoo – Krenglbach 
Tiergarten Schönbrunn – Vienna
Tiergarten Walding – Walding, Upper Austria

Belarus
Grodno Zoo
Minsk Zoo

Belgium
Antwerp Zoo
Bellewaerde – Ypres
Le Monde Sauvage – Aywaille
Pairi Daiza – Brugelette, Hainaut
Pakawi Park – Olmen, Mol
Parc animalier de Bouillon
Planckendael Zoo – Muizen, Mechelen

Bosnia and Herzegovina
Pionirska dolina – Sarajevo
Zoo vrt Bingo – Tuzla

Bulgaria
Lovech Zoo
Pleven Zoo
Sofia Zoo
Stara Zagora Zoo
Varna Zoo

Croatia
Bizik family Zoo – Našice
Osijek Zoo
Zagreb Zoo

Cyprus
Limassol Zoo
Mazotos Camel Park
Melios Zoo Nicosia
Paphos Zoo

Czech Republic

Denmark
Aalborg Zoo
Copenhagen Zoo – Frederiksberg
Crocodile Zoo – Eskilstrup
Givskud Zoo
Jesperhus – Nykøbing Mors
Odense Zoo
Randers Tropical Zoo
Ree Park Safari – Ebeltoft
Skandinavisk Dyrepark – Djursland

Estonia
Elistvere Animal Park – Elistvere, Jõgeva County
Tallinn Zoo – Tallinn (1939)

Finland
Ähtäri Zoo
Escurial Zoo and Flower Park
Kitee Zoo
Korkeasaari Zoo – an island zoo in Helsinki (1889)
Kuopio Zoo
Orimattilan kotieläinpuisto – Orimattila
PikkuKili – Lieksa
Ranua Zoo – Ranua
Särkänniemi Children's Zoo – Tampere
Tropicario – Helsinki
Zoolandia – Lieto

France
Citadel of Besançon – Besançon
Cleres Zoological Park – Clères
Haute Touche Zoological Park – Obterre
Jardin Zoologique d'Acclimatation du Bois de Boulogne (zoo section closed in 1912) – Paris
Jardin Zoologique de la Tête d'or – Parc de la Tête d'or, Lyon
Jardin Zoologique Tropical – La Londe-les-Maures
La Bourbansais Zoo – Ille-et-Vilaine
La Palmyre Zoo – Les Mathes
La Vallée des Singes – Romagne
Ménagerie du Jardin des Plantes – Paris
Parc Animalier de Sainte-Croix – Rhodes
Parc des Félins – Nesles
Parc des Oiseaux – Villars-les-Dombes
Parc Phœnix – Nice
Parc Zoologique de Lunaret – Montpellier
Parc Zoologique et Botanique de Mulhouse – Mulhouse
Paris Zoological Park, also known as Zoo de Vincennes – Paris
Planete Sauvage (safari park) – Port-Saint-Père
Réserve Africaine de Sigean – Sigean
Réserve Africaine & Parc Zoologique et Botanique de Thoiry – Thoiry
Safari de Peaugres – Peaugres
Zoo and Botanical Garden of Branféré – Le Guerno
Zoo d'Amnéville – Amnéville
Zoo de Cerza – Hermival-les-Vaux
Zoo de Doué – Doué-la-Fontaine
Zoo de la Flèche – La Flèche
ZooParc de Beauval – Saint-Aignan-sur-Cher

Germany

Gibraltar
Alameda Wildlife Conservation Park

Greece
Attica Zoological Park – Athens
Zoological Park of Thessaloniki – Thessaloniki

Hungary
Bear Farm – Veresegyház
Budakeszi Wildlife Park – Budakeszi
Budapest Zoo & Botanical Garden – Budapest
Debrecen Zoo and Amusement Park
Gyöngyös Zoo
Jászberény Zoo & Botanical Garden
Kecskemét Wild Garden
Kittenberger Kálmán Zoo & Botanical Garden – Veszprém
Miskolc Zoo
Pécs Zoo
Sóstó Zoo – Nyíregyháza
Szeged Wildlife Park
Tisza-lake Ökocentrum – Poroszló
Tropicarium – Budapest
Xantus János Zoo – Győr

Ireland
Dublin Zoo – Dublin
Fota Wildlife Park – County Cork
National Reptile Zoo – County Kilkenny
Emerald Park – County Meath

Italy
1° Parco Zoo della Fauna Europea – Poppi, Arezzo
Bioparco di Roma – Rome
Bioparco di Sicilia – Carini, Palermo
Bioparco Faunistico d'Abruzzo – Castel di Sangro, L'Aquila
Centro Faunistico Parco Gallorose – Cecina, Leghorn
Città della Domenica – Perugia
Faunistic Park Le Cornelle – Valbrembo, Bergamo
Giardino Zoologico di Pistoia – Pistoia
L'Oasi degli Animali – San Sebastiano Po, Turin
Oasi di Sant'Alessio con Vialone – Sant'Alessio con Vialone, Pavia
Parc Animalier d'Introd – Introd, Aosta
Parco degli Angeli – Giba, Carbonia-Iglesias
Parco dei Pappagalli – Latisana, Udine
Parco della Villa Pallavicino – Stresa, Verbano-Cusio-Ossola
 – Collazzone, Perugia
Parco Faunistico Al Bosco – Grezzana, Verona
Parco Faunistico Cappeller – Cartigliano, Vicenza
Parco Faunistico La Torbiera – Agrate Conturbia, Novara
Parco Faunistico Valcorba – Pozzonovo, Padua
Parco Natura Viva – Bussolengo, Verona
Parco Ornitologico Villa d'Orleans – Palermo
Parco Safari delle Langhe – Murazzano, Cuneo
Parco Zoo Falconara – Falconara Marittima, Ancona
Parco Zoo La Rupe – Civitella Casanova, Pescara
Parco Zoo Punta Verde – Lignano Sabbiadoro, Udine
Safari Park d'Abruzzo – Rocca San Giovanni, Chieti
Safari Park Pombia – Pombia, Novara
Safari Ravenna – Ravenna
Zoo Di Napoli – Naples
Zoom Torino – Cumiana, Turin
Zoosafari Fasanolandia – Fasano, Brindisi

Latvia
Latgales Zoo – Daugavpils
Minizoo "Dobuļi" – Iecava Municipality
Riga Zoo

Lithuania
Lithuanian Zoo – Kaunas

Moldova
Chişinău Zoo, Chişinău

Monaco
Zoological Garden of Monaco

Netherlands
Apenheul – Apeldoorn
Artis – Amsterdam
BestZoo – Best
Burgers' Zoo – Arnhem
Dierenpark de Oliemeulen – Tilburg
DierenPark Amersfoort
Dierenrijk – Mierlo
Diergaarde Blijdorp, Rotterdam
Dolfinarium Harderwijk
GaiaPark – Kerkrade
Ouwehands Dierenpark – Rhenen
Safaripark Beekse Bergen – Hilvarenbeek
Taman Indonesia – Kallenkote
Uilen- en Dierenpark De Paay – Beesd
Vogelpark Avifauna – Alphen aan den Rijn
Wildlands Adventure Zoo Emmen – Emmen
Zoo Park Overloon

North Macedonia
Bitola Zoo – Bitola
Skopje Zoo – Skopje

Norway
Den lille dyrehage – Sundebru
Haugaland zoo – Torvastad
Kristiansand Zoo and Amusement Park
Namsskogan Familiepark – Trones
Oslo reptilpark
Polar Park – Bardu

Poland
Akcent Zoo Białystok – Białystok
Fokarium na Helu – Hel
Kraków Zoo – Kraków
Ogród Zoologiczny w Łodzi – Łódź
Ogród Zoologiczny w Płocku – Płock
Miejski Ogród Zoologiczny Wybrzeża w Gdańsku-Oliwie – Gdańsk
New Zoo in Poznań
Ogród Fauny Polskiej- zoo w Bydgoszczy – Bydgoszcz
Ogród Ornitologiczny w Łebie- Bird Park in Łeba – Łeba
Ogród Zoologiczny Canpol w Sieroczynie k. Człuchowa – Człuchów
Ogród Zoologiczny Dolina Charlotty w Strzelinku k. Słupska – Słupsk
Old Zoo in Poznań
Opole Zoo – Opole
Park Dzikich Zwierząt (Wild Animal Park) Kadzidłowo – Kadzidłowo
Silesian Zoological Garden – Chorzów
Warsaw Zoo – Warsaw
Wrocław Zoo – Wrocław (In terms of number of animal species is 3rd zoo in the world)
Zamość Zoo – Zamość
Ogród Zoobotaniczny w Toruniu – Toruń
ZOO FARMA w Łącznej – Łączna- Mieroszów
Zoo Safari Borysew – Borysew- Poddębice
Zoo Safari Świerkocin – Świerkocin
Zoo w Braniewie – Braniewo
Zoo w Nowym Tomyślu – Nowy Tomyśl

Portugal
Badoca Safari Park – Vila Nova de Santo André
Lisbon Zoo – Lisbon
Parque Biológico de Gaia – Vila Nova de Gaia
Parque Zoológico de Lagos – Lagos
Zoo da Maia – Maia
Zoo de Lourosa – Lourosa
Zoo Santo Inácio
Zoomarine – Albufeira, Algarve

Romania
Brăila Zoological Garden – Brăila
Brașov Zoological Garden – Brașov Cartierul Noua
Bucov Zoological Garden – Bucov near Ploiești
Călărași Zoological Garden – Călărași
Craiova Zoological Garden – Craiova
Focșani Zoological Garden – Focșani
Galați Zoological Garden – Galați
Oradea Zoological Garden – Oradea
Pitești Zoological Garden – Pitești
Târgoviște Zoological Garden – Târgoviște
Zoo Băneasa – Bucharest
Zoo Bârlad – Bârlad
Zoo Hunedoara – Hunedoara
Zoo Sibiu – Sibiu
Zoo Târgu Mureș – Târgu Mureș

Russia
Abakan "Wildlife Cente" – Abakan
Cheboksary Zoo – Cheboksary
Chelyabinsk Zoo – Chelyabinsk
Chita Zoo – Chita
Ekaterinburg Zoo – Ekaterinburg
Ivanovo Zoo – Ivanovo
Izhevsk Zoo – Izhevsk
Kaliningrad Zoo – Kaliningrad
Kazan Zoo – Kazan
Khabarovsk Zoo – Khabarovsk
Krasnoyarsk park of Flora and Fauna "Roev Ruchei" – Krasnoyarsk
Leningrad Zoo – Saint Petersburg
Lipetsk Zoo – Lipetsk
Moscow Zoo – Moscow
Novosibirsk Zoo – Novosibirsk
Omsk Zoo – Bolsherech'e, Omsk
Penza Zoo – Penza
Perm Zoo – Perm
Rostov Zoo – Rostov-on-Don
Sakhalin Zoological and Botanic Park – Yuzhno-Sakhalinsk
Samara Zoo – Samara
Tula Exotarium – Tula
Yakutsk Zoo – Yakutsk

Serbia
Belgrade Zoo – Belgrade 
Bor Zoo – Bor
Jagodina Zoo – Jagodina
Palić Zoo – Palić
Zoo Miki – Kolut
Zoo Park Koki – Inđija

Slovakia
Bojnice Zoo – Bojnice
Bratislava Zoo – Bratislava
Košice Zoo – Košice
Spišská Nová Ves Zoo – Spišská Nová Ves
ZOO Stropkov – Stropkov

Slovenia
Ljubljana Zoo – Ljubljana

Spain
Avifauna (núcleo zoológico) Zoo – Lugo
Barcelona Zoo – Barcelona
Cabarceno Natural Park – Cantabria
Las Águilas Jungle Park – Tenerife
Loro Parque – Tenerife
Maroparque – La Palma
Monkey Park (Tenerife) – Tenerife
Mundomar – Benidorm
Parque de la Naturaleza de Cabárceno – Obregón
Parque Zoológico de Guadalajara – Guadalajara
Parque Zoológico y Jardín Botánico Alberto Durán – Jerez de la Frontera
Rancho Texas Park – Lanzarote
Terra Natura – Benidorm
Terra Natura – Murcia
Valencia Bioparc – Valencia
Zoo Aquarium de Madrid – Madrid
Zoo de Fuengirola – Málaga
Zoo de Santillana – Santillana del Mar
Zoo de Sevilla – Seville

Sweden
Borås Djurpark – Borås
Furuviksparken – Gävle
Grönåsen Älg- och Lantdjurspark – Kosta
Järvzoo – Järvsö
Junsele Djurpark – Junsele
Kolmården Wildlife Park –
Lycksele Zoo – Lycksele 
Nordens Ark – Bohuslän
Öland Zoo and Amusement Park – Färjestaden, Öland
Parken Zoo – Eskilstuna
Skånes Djurpark – Höör 
Skansen– Stockholm
Slottsskogens djurpark – Gothenburg
Ystad Djurpark – Ystad

Switzerland
Knies Kinderzoo – Rapperswil
Le Bois du Petit Chateau – La Chaux-de-Fonds
Tierpark Dählhölzli – Bern
Tierpark Goldau – Goldau
Tierpark Lange Erlen – Basel
Wildpark Bruderhaus – Winterthur
Wildpark Langenberg – Langnau am Albis
Wildpark Peter und Paul – St. Gallen
Zoo Basel – Basel
Zoo La Garenne – Le Vaud
Zürich Zoologischer Garten – Zürich

Ukraine

Kyiv Zoo

Odesa Zoo

United Kingdom and Crown dependencies

Africa Alive – East Anglia
Amazon World Zoo – Isle of Wight
Amazona – East Anglia
Amazonia World of Reptiles – East Anglia
Banham Zoo – East Anglia
Beale Park – Berkshire, England
Belfast Zoo – Belfast, Northern Ireland
Birdland Park and Gardens – Bourton-on-the-Water, Gloucestershire
Birdworld – Surrey, England
Birmingham Nature Centre – Birmingham
Blackbrook Zoological Park – Staffordshire
Blackpool Zoo – Lancashire
Blair Drummond Safari Park – Stirlingshire, Scotland
Borth Wild Animal Kingdom – Mid Wales
Camperdown Wildlife Centre (part of Camperdown Country Park) – Dundee
Chessington Zoo – London
Chester Zoo – Cheshire
Colchester Zoo – East Anglia
Cotswold Wildlife Park – Oxfordshire
Curraghs Wildlife Park – Isle of Man
Dartmoor Zoological Park – Devon
Drayton Manor Zoo – part of Drayton Manor Theme Park, Staffordshire
Drusillas Zoo Park – East Sussex
Dudley Zoo – West Midlands
Durrell Wildlife Park – Jersey, Channel Islands
Edinburgh Zoo – Edinburgh, Scotland
Exmoor Zoo – Devon
Five Sisters Zoo – West Calder, Scotland
Flamingo Land Resort – North Yorkshire
Folly Farm Adventure Park and Zoo
Hamerton Zoo – East Anglia
Highland Wildlife Park – Highland, Scotland
Howletts Wild Animal Park – Kent
Isle of Wight Zoo – Isle of Wight
Knowsley Safari Park – Merseyside
Lakeland Wildlife Oasis – Cumbria
Linton Zoological Gardens – East Anglia
London Zoo – London
Longleat Safari Park – Wiltshire
Lotherton Hall Bird Garden – Aberford, Leeds, West Yorkshire
Marwell Zoo – Hampshire
Monkey World – Dorset
New Forest Wildlife Park – Hampshire
Newquay Zoo – Cornwall
Noah's Ark Zoo Farm – Bristol
Northumberland Country Zoo – Morpeth
Paignton Zoo – Devon
Paradise Park, Cornwall – Cornwall
Paradise Wildlife Park – Hertfordshire
Pettitts Animal Adventure Park – East Anglia
Plantasia – Swansea, Wales
Port Lympne Wild Animal Park – Kent
SeaLife Great Yarmouth – East Anglia
Shaldon Wildlife Trust – Devon
South Lakes Safari Zoo – Cumbria
The Living Rainforest – Berkshire
Thrigby Hall – East Anglia
Tropical World at Roundhay Park – Leeds
Tropiquaria – West Somerset
Twycross Zoo – Leicestershire
Wales Ape and Monkey Sanctuary (formerly Cefn-yr-Erw Primate Sanctuary) – Wales
Welsh Mountain Zoo – North Wales
West Midland Safari Park – Worcestershire
Wetheriggs Zoo and Animal Sanctuary – County Durham (previously in Penrith)
Whipsnade Zoo – East Anglia
Wildwood Discovery Park – Kent
Wingham Wildlife Park – Kent
Woburn Safari Park – Bedfordshire
Yorkshire Wildlife Park – Doncaster

North America

Belize
Belize Zoo

Bermuda
Bermuda Aquarium, Museum and Zoo

Canada
List of zoos in Canada

Costa Rica
Africa Mia
Arenal Eco Zoo – El Castillo, Alajuela
Centro de Conservación de Santa Ana
Instituto Clodomiro Picado
Jaguar Rescue Center
Jardin de las Mariposas (Mariposario Spirogyra)
La Paz Waterfall Gardens
Las Pumas Cat Zoo
Monteverde Theme Park – formerly Frog Pond of Monteverde
Parque Viborana
Parque Zoológico Nacional Simón Bolívar
Reptilandia

Guatemala
Auto Safari Chapin
La Aurora Zoo

Mexico
Africam Safari – Puebla
Bioparque Estrella – Montemorelos, Nuevo Leon
Chapultepec Zoo – Mexico City
El Nido – Ixtapaluca
Guadalajara Zoo – Guadalajara, Jalisco
Parque de Aragón Zoo – Mexico City

Zoo León – León, Guanajuato
Zoofari – Cuernavaca, Morelos
Zoológico Benito Juárez – Morelia, Michoacán
Zoológico Los Coyotes – Mexico City
Zoológico Zacango – Toluca, México State
ZOOMAT – Tuxtla Gutiérrez, Chiapas

Panama
Parque Municipal Summit – Panama City

United States
List of zoos in the United States

South America

Argentina
Bubalcó – General Roca, Río Negro
Buenos Aires Zoo – Buenos Aires
Estación de Cría de Animales Salvajes – La Plata, Buenos Aires Province
Mar del Plata Aquarium – Mar del Plata, Buenos Aires Province
Mendoza Zoological Park – Mendoza, Mendoza Province
Mundo Marino – San Clemente del Tuyú, Buenos Aires Province
Parque Independencia/Bahía Blanca Zoo – Bahía Blanca, Buenos Aires Province
Rawson Zoo – Rawson, Chubut Province
Temaikèn – Belén de Escobar, Buenos Aires Province
Zoo Batán – Mar del Plata, Buenos Aires Province
Zoo Córdoba – Córdoba, Córdoba Province
Zoo Corrientes – Corrientes, Corrientes Province
Zoo de América – Rivadavia, Buenos Aires Province
Zoo de Varela – Florencio Varela, Buenos Aires Province
Zoo La Plata – La Plata, Buenos Aires Province
Zoo Luján – Luján, Buenos Aires Province
Zoo Paraiso – Mar del Plata, Buenos Aires Province
Zoo Yku Huasi – Malvinas Argentinas, Buenos Aires Province

Brazil

Acre
Zoológico do Parque Chico Mendes – Rio Branco

Amazonas
Parque Zoológico Municipal – Manaus
Zoológico do Centro de Instrução de Guerra na Selva – Manaus

Bahia
Parque Zoobotânico Getúlio Vargas – Salvador
Parque Zoobotânico Rolf – Mata de São João

Ceará
Parque Zoológico Sargento Prata – Fortaleza

Distrito Federal
Jardim Zoológico de Brasília – Brasília

Goiás
Parque Zoológico de Goiânia – Goiânia

Mato Grosso
Parque Zoológico de Rondonópolis – Rondonópolis
Zoológico da Universidade Federal de Mato Grosso – Cuiabá
Zoológico Municipal de Alta Floresta – Alta Floresta

Minas Gerais
Fundação Zoo-Botânica de Belo Horizonte – Belo Horizonte
Jardim Zoológico Lauro Palhares – Pará de Minas
Parque Zoobotânico de Pouso Alegre – Pouso Alegre
Parque Zoobotânico Doutor Mário Frota – Varginha
Zoológico Municipal Amaro Sátiro de Araújo – Montes Claros
Zoológico Municipal de Sete Lagoas – Sete Lagoas
Zoológico Municipal de Três Pontas – Três Pontas
Zoológico Municipal Parque do Sabiá – Uberlândia
Zoológico Municipal Parque dos Jacarandás – Uberaba

Pará
Parque Zoobotânico de Carajás – Parauapebas
Parque Zoobotânico do Museu Paraense Emílio Goeldi – Belém

Paraná
Parque das Aves – Foz do Iguaçu
Parque Ecológico Municipal Danilo Galafassi – Cascavel
Zoológico Bosque Guarani – Foz do Iguaçu
Zoológico de Matelândia – Matelândia
Zoológico Municipal de Curitiba – Curitiba

Paraíba
Parque Zoológico Arruda Câmara – João Pessoa

Pernambuco
Parque Zoológico Municipal Antônio Melo Verçosa – Vitória de Santo Antão
Zoo Botanical Park Dois Irmaos – Recife

Piauí
Parque Zoobotânico – Teresina

Rio de Janeiro
Jardim Zoológico de Niterói – Niterói
Rio de Janeiro Zoo – Rio de Janeiro
Zoológico Municipal de Volta Redonda – Volta Redonda

Rio Grande do Sul
Gramado Zoo – Gramado
Pampas Safari – Gravataí
Parque Zoológico – Sapucaia do Sul
Zoológico do Litoral – Osório
Zoológico Municipal de Cachoeira do Sul – Cachoeira do Sul
Zoológico Municipal de Canoas – Canoas

Rondônia
Zoológico de Vilhena – Vilhena

Roraima
Zoológico do Sétimo Batalhão de Infantaria de Selva – Boa Vista

Santa Catarina
Parque Cyro Gevaerd Santur – Balneário Camboriú
Parque Ecológico e Zoobotânico de Brusque – Brusque
Parque Zoobotânico de Joinville – Joinville
Zoológico Pomerode – Pomerode

São Paulo
Jardim Zoobotânico de Franca – Franca
Municipal Zoological Park Quinzinho de Barros – Sorocaba
Parque Ecológico "Dr. Antônio T. Viana" – São Carlos
Parque Ecológico Municipal "Cid Almeida Franco" – Americana
Parque Zoológico de Ilha Solteira – Ilha Solteira
Parque Zoológico Dr. Fábio de Sá Barreto – Ribeirão Preto
Parque Zoológico Eugênio Walter – Boituva
Parque Zoológico Municipal de Guarulhos (Guarulhos)
São Paulo Zoo – São Paulo
Zoológico de Jardinópolis – Jardinópolis
Zoológico Municipal de Araçatuba "Dr. Flávio Leite Ribeiro" – Araçatuba
Zoológico Municipal de Bauru – Bauru
Zoológico Municipal de Buri – Buri
Zoológico Municipal de Campinas – Campinas
Zoológico Municipal de Catanduva – Catanduva
Zoológico Municipal de Garça "Dr. Belírio Guimarães Brandão" – Garça
Zoológico Municipal de Leme – Leme
Zoológico Municipal de Limeira – Limeira
Zoológico Municipal de Lins – Lins
Zoológico Municipal de Mogi Guaçu – Mogi Guaçu
Zoológico Municipal de Mogi Mirim "Luiz Gonzaga Amoêdo Campos" – Mogi-Mirim
Zoológico Municipal de Pedreira – Pedreira
Zoológico Municipal de Piracicaba – Piracicaba
Zoológico Municipal de Santa Bárbara d'Oeste – Santa Bárbara d'Oeste
Zoológico Municipal de São Bernardo do Campo – São Bernardo do Campo
Zoológico Municipal de São José do Rio Preto – São José do Rio Preto
Zoológico Municipal de São Vicente – São Vicente
Zoológico Municipal de Taboão da Serra – Taboão da Serra
Zoológico Municipal Henrique Pedroni – Sumaré
Zoológico Municipal Nestor Bologna – Vargem Grande do Sul
Zoológico Vale dos Bichos – São José dos Campos
Zooparque Itatiba – Itatiba

Sergipe
Boa Luz Eco Parque – Laranjeiras
Parque Zoológico – Aracaju

Chile
Buin Zoo – Buin, Chile
Chilean National Zoo – Santiago, Chile
Concepción Zoo – Concepción, Chile
La Serena Zoo – La Serena, Chile
Parque safari de Rancagua – Rancagua, Chile
Quilpue Zoo – Quilpue, Chile

Colombia
Barranquilla Zoo – Barranquilla
Bioparque Los Ocarros – Villavicencio
Cali Zoo – Cali
Hacienda Nápoles – Medellín
Jaime Duque Park Zoo – Bogotá
Santa Fe Zoo – Medellín
Santacruz Zoo – San Antonio del Tequendama

Ecuador
Bioparque Amaru – Cuenca
Guayabamba Zoo – Quito

French Guiana
French Guiana Zoo – Montsinéry

Guyana
Guyana Zoo

Paraguay
Botanical Garden and Zoo of Asunción – Asunción

Peru
Parque de las Leyendas, San Miguel, Lima
Parque Zoológico de Huachipa – Ate, Lima
Zoocriadero – Lima
Zoológico de Quistococha – Iquitos, Loreto

Suriname
Paramaribo Zoo – Paramaribo

Uruguay
Parque Lecocq – Montevideo
Zoológico Municipal Villa Dolores – Montevideo

Venezuela
Bararida Zoo – Bararida

References

Sources

Lists of buildings and structures